Cry Tuff Dub Encounter Part 2 is a 1979 reggae album by Prince Far I. It was recorded at Harry J's studio in Kingston, Jamaica and mixed by Prince Jammy. The album was reissued on compact disc in expanded form as Dubwise, with additional tracks taken from singles from the same era.

Track listing 

 "Suru-Lere Dub"
 "Anambra Dub"
 "Kaduna Dub"
 "Oyo Dub"
 "Borno Dub"
 "Ogun Dub"
 "Bendel Dub"
 "Ondo Dub"
 "Gongola Dub"

Personnel 
 Sly Dunbar, Carlton "Santa" Davis - drums
 Robbie Shakespeare, George "Fully" Fullwood - bass guitar
 Earl "Chinna" Smith - lead guitar
 Eric "Bingy Bunny" Lamont - rhythm guitar
 Bobby Kalphat, Errol "Tarzan" Nelson, Easy Snappin' - keyboards
 Richard "Dirty Harry" Hall, Don D. Junior - horns
 Bongo Herman, Prince Far I - percussion

Mixed by Prince Jammy

References

External links 
 Cry Tuff Dub Encounter Part 2 at Roots Archives

Prince Far I albums
1979 albums
Dub albums